The 2018–19 Michigan State Spartans women's basketball team represented Michigan State University during the 2018–19 NCAA Division I women's basketball season. The Spartans, led by 12th-year head coach Suzy Merchant, played their home games at the Breslin Center in East Lansing, Michigan as members of the Big Ten Conference. They finished with a record of 25–12, 9–9 in Big Ten play to finish in a 4 way tie for sixth place. They advanced to the quarterfinals of the Big Ten women's tournament where they lost to Maryland. They received an at-large bid to the NCAA women's tournament where they defeated Central Michigan in the first round before losing to Notre Dame in the second round.

Roster

Schedule and results

|-
!colspan=9 style=| Exhibition

|-
!colspan=9 style=| Non-conference regular season

|-
!colspan=9 style=| Big Ten regular season

|-
!colspan=9 style=|Big Ten tournament

|-
!colspan=9 style=|NCAA Women's Tournament

Rankings
2018–19 NCAA Division I women's basketball rankings

See also
2018–19 Michigan State Spartans men's basketball team

References

Michigan State
Michigan
Michigan
Michigan State Spartans women's basketball seasons
Michigan State